Brea Colleen Grant is an American actress, writer, and director. She played the character of Daphne Millbrook in the NBC television series Heroes.

Early life
Brea Grant was born and raised in Marshall, Texas. She earned bachelor's and master's degrees in American studies from the University of Texas at Austin.

Career

Acting
Grant's television acting career has included the roles of Jean Binnel on Friday Night Lights, Daphne Milbrook on Heroes, and Ryan Chambers on Dexter.

She played the supporting lead in the film Something Else, which premiered at Tribeca in 2019.

Writing, directing, and producing
Grant directed and co-wrote her first feature, an apocalyptic road trip movie called Best Friends Forever, in 2013. The movie premiered at the Slamdance Film Festival. She wrote and starred in the series The Real Housewives of Horror for Nerdist in 2014. She directed the short film Feminist Campfire Stories, which won the Audience Award at the Women in Comedy Film Festival.

Grant was nominated for a Daytime Emmy as a producer of the series EastSiders. She also acted in the show and wrote and directed an episode in Season 4. 

Grant wrote and directed her second feature, 12 Hour Shift, in 2019. The dark heist film stars Angela Bettis, Chloe Farnworth, David Arquette, and Mick Foley.

Other media
Grant and author Mallory O'Meara began co-hosting the weekly podcast Reading Glasses in June 2017. The show is part of the Maximum Fun network and is focused on books and reading culture.

Grant created the comic book miniseries We Will Bury You with her brother Zane Grant and artist Kyle Strahm. She also wrote the SuicideGirls comic miniseries, based on the pin-up website of the same name.

In 2020, Six Foot Press published Mary, a graphic novel by Grant and artist Yishan Li. The title character is a fictional great-great-great-great-great-granddaughter of writer and Frankenstein creator Mary Shelley.

Filmography

References

External links

Living people
21st-century American actresses
Actresses from Texas
American comics writers
American film actresses
American television actresses
American women podcasters
American podcasters
Female comics writers
People from Marshall, Texas
University of Texas at Austin College of Liberal Arts alumni
Year of birth missing (living people)
American women screenwriters
American women film directors
Screenwriters from Texas
Film directors from Texas
21st-century American screenwriters
21st-century American women writers